Yap is an island in the Caroline Islands of the western Pacific Ocean.

Yap may also refer to:
 Yap State, in the Federated States of Micronesia

Science and technology
 Yap (company), an American technology company acquired by Amazon
 YAP (genetics), a mutation on the Y chromosome
 YAP (Prolog), an implementation of the Prolog programming language
 YAP (protein), a transcriptional co-activator
 Yet Another Previewer, a computer program to view DVI and PostScript files

Other
 New Azerbaijan Party, (Yeni Azərbaycan Partiyası)
 Yap International Airport, by IATA airport code
 Yap, a bark made by small dogs

People with the name
 Yap (surname), Hakka and Minnan romanization of the common Asian surname Ye
 Yap Ah Loy (1837–1885), founder of Kuala Lumpur, Malaysia
 Yap Kwan Seng (1846–1902), the last Chinese kapitan of Kuala Lumpur
 Yap Thiam Hien (1913–1989), Indonesian human rights advocate
 Pedro Yap (1918–2003), Chief Justice of the Philippines
 Arthur Yap (1943–2006), Singaporean poet
 Arthur Yap (politician) (born 1965), Filipino politician
 John Yap (born 1959), British Columbia politician
 Richard Yap (born 1967), Filipino actor and businessman
 James Yap (born 1982), Filipino professional basketball player
 Roger Yap (born 1977), Filipino professional basketball player
 Kenny Yap, executive chairman of Qian Hu Corporation
 Miranda Yap (1948–2015), chemical engineer
 Yap Weng Wah (born 1983), Malaysian serial sex offender and hebephile

See also
 Yapese language
 Yapp
 Yong (disambiguation)